Sarah Tyson Rorer (18 October 1849 – 27 December 1937) was an American food writer and pioneer in the field of domestic science. Rorer has been described as the first American dietitian.

Biography

She was born at Richboro, Pennsylvania, daughter of Charles Tyson Heston, a pharmacist, and Elizabeth Sagers. Rorer received her early education in East Aurora, New York, and was educated in cooking at the New Century School of Cookery, Philadelphia. After she completed school, she herself became a teacher of cooking and dietetics at the New Century Club. In 1884 she founded the Philadelphia School of Cookery. In the course of her career, Mrs. Rorer gave many cooking exhibitions, some of them at the Pennsylvania Chautauqua. She was President of the women's auxiliary board of the Pennsylvania Chautauqua. Her most famous demonstrations were at the St. Louis World's Fair of 1904, where she was director and manager of the East and West pavilions.

She was editor and part owner of Table Talk from 1886 to 1892, was an editor of Household News from 1893 to 1897, then was a member of the staff of the Ladies Home Journal until 1911 when Good Housekeeping secured her services.  She was a director of the Pennsylvania Chautauqua School of Domestic Science.

Rorer was not a vegetarian but she did author a successful vegetarian cookbook, Mrs. Rorer's Vegetable Cookery and Meat Substitutes which illustrated how to cook three meatless meals a day.

In 1871, she married William Albert Rorer, from whom she separated around 1896. They had three children. Two boys survived them. She died at her home in Colebrook, Pennsylvania.

Selected publications

Rorer published many books on cooking which became standard.  Among her publications were:
Philadelphia Cook Book (1886)
Hot Weather Dishes (1888)
Home Candy Making (1889)
How to Cook Vegetables (1891)
Twenty Quick Soups (1894)
Sandwiches (1894)
New Salads for Dinners, Luncheons, Suppers and Receptions, with a Group of Odd Salads and some Ceylon Salads (1897)
Made Over Dishes (1898)
Mrs. Rorer's New Cook Book (1902)
World’s Fair Souvenir Cook Book (1904)
Mrs. Rorer's Every Day Menu Book (1905)
Many Ways of Cooking Eggs (1907)
My Best 250 Recipes (1907)
Mrs. Rorer's Vegetable Cookery and Meat Substitutes (1909)
Dainties (1912)
Diet for the Sick (1914)
 How to Use a Chafing Dish
 Colonial Cookery
 A Book on Diet and Cookery

Further reading

Other
Emma Weigley completed doctoral studies in nutrition at New York University in 1971, with a thesis titled Sarah Tyson Rorer (1849-1937), a Biographical Study.

External links
 
 
 
 Pennsylvania Center for the Book biography

References

1849 births
1937 deaths
American food writers
American women journalists
Diet food advocates
Dietitians
Women cookbook writers
Writers from Pennsylvania